Sheikh Harunur Rashid is a Bangladesh Awami League politician and the former Member of Parliament from Khulna-1. He is the incumbent Chairman of the Khulna Zilla Parishad.

Career
Rashid was elected from Khulna-1 in 1986 as a candidate of Bangladesh Awami League. He was reelected in 1996 from Khulna-1 as a candidate of Bangladesh Awami League. He is the Chairman of the Khulna Zilla Parishad.

References

Awami League politicians
Living people
3rd Jatiya Sangsad members
5th Jatiya Sangsad members
Year of birth missing (living people)